Hoppa may refer to:

Hoppá (film), 1993 Hungarian film
"Hoppa" (Funda song)
Heathrow Hotel Hoppa, the official transfer bus operation for most Heathrow hotels
hoppa (travel company), previously known as Resorthoppa, UK travel company
 Soccer Supporters reaction when Ajax scores

People
DJ Hoppa (born 1983 as Lee Gresh), U.S. music producer and DJ
John Hopoate (born 1974), rugby league footballer
Rob Hoppa, Canadian anthropologist

See also